The 1998 World Badminton Grand Prix was the 16th edition of the World Badminton Grand Prix finals. It was held in Bandar Seri Begawan, Brunei from February 24 to February 28, 1999. It did not take place in December as in the years before due to the collision with the 1998 Asian Games in Bangkok, Thailand. 
The prize money was USD300,000.

The players were qualified according to the ranking on 1 December 1998. In men's singles the first 16 players were qualified, in women's singles the first 12 and in the doubles the first eight. Margit Borg, the number 13 in the women's singles rank, could participate because the Susi Susanti was pregnant.

Men's singles

Group A

Group B

Group C

Group D

Knockout stage

Women's singles

Group A

Group B

Group C

Group D

Knockout stage

Men's doubles

Women's doubles

Mixed doubles

References
Smash: World Grand Prix Finals, Bandar Seri Begawan 1998

World Grand Prix
World Badminton Grand Prix
International sports competitions hosted by Brunei
Badminton tournaments in Brunei
Bad